Farrer Road MRT station is an underground Mass Rapid Transit (MRT) station on the Circle line, located along the boundary of Farrer Court (Bukit Timah) and Tyersall (Tanglin) planning areas, Singapore. It is built underneath Farrer Road, the thoroughfare which gives the station its name, and is located near the Farrer Gardens Estate.

Farrer Road was named after Roland John Farrer, who was President of the Municipal Commissioners from 1919 to 1931. To avoid confusion with Farrer Park MRT station, the station was renamed to Farrer Road on 11 January 2007. The station serves the nearby Farrer Gardens housing estate, many condominiums and private homes, schools, and places of worship.

Farrer Road station is built underneath its namesake road, between the junctions of Empress Road and Woollerton Park.

History

The junction of Farrer Road and Empress Road had been realigned from 1 December 2004, this marks the start of construction of Farrer Road MRT station. The station was renamed from Farrer to Farrer Road on 11 January 2007.

On 24 May 2008, a section of Cornwall Gardens above a section between Holland Village and Farrer Road stations along the Circle line collapsed, creating a 3 metre deep hole. No one was injured, but some of the households lost their access to cable TV and Internet, as well as the water supply. This is the third road that caved in during the construction of the Circle line.

It is often mistaken for Farrer Park MRT station; as such, station masters have put up a sign informing both locals and tourists that Farrer Road MRT is not the one located near the famous Mustafa Centre that they likely wanted to visit.

Art in Transit
The artwork featured in this station under the Art in Transit programme is Art Lineage by Erzan Adam. In this community project, using lines as a key element to emphasise unity in art and in the community, members of the public were invited to paint coloured lines in any way they liked over three canvasses. The artist then digitised and overlayered the images to create a single piece, which is now displayed on the lift shaft in the station.

References

External links

 

Railway stations in Singapore opened in 2011
Bukit Timah
Mass Rapid Transit (Singapore) stations